An oncocytoma is a tumor made up of oncocytes, epithelial cells characterized by an excessive amount of mitochondria, resulting in an abundant acidophilic, granular cytoplasm. The cells and the tumor that they compose are often benign but sometimes may be premalignant or malignant.

Presentation
An oncocytoma is an epithelial tumor composed of oncocytes, large eosinophilic cells having small, round, benign-appearing nuclei with large nucleoli.

Oncocytoma can arise in a number of organs.

Renal oncocytoma

Renal oncocytoma is thought to arise from the intercalated cells of collecting ducts of the kidney. It represents 5% to 15% of surgically resected renal neoplasms.

Salivary gland oncocytoma

The salivary gland oncocytoma is a well-circumscribed, benign neoplastic growth also called an oxyphilic adenoma. It comprises about 1% of all salivary gland tumors. The histopathology is marked by sheets of large swollen polyhedral epithelial oncocytes, which are granular acidophilic parotid cells with centrally located nuclei. The granules are created by the mitochondria.

Symptoms
Salivary gland oncocytomas are most common in ages 70–80, females, the parotid gland (85–90%), and are firm, slowly growing, painless masses of less than 4 cm. They may be bilateral.

Thyroid oncocytoma
Thyroid oncocytomas can be benign (adenomas) or malignant (carcinomas). Also known as Hürtle cell tumours. Grossly, oncocytic adenomas are encapsulated, solid nodules with a characteristic brown cut surface. The gross appearance of a minimally invasive oncocytic carcinoma is indistinguishable to that of an adenoma, while widely invasive oncocytic carcinomas are obviously invasive macroscopically and display pervasive vascular invasion with multifocal involvement of the thyroid gland. There are no reliable cytologic features which distinguish oncocytic adenomas from carcinomas and the only criterion for a diagnosis of malignancy is the identification of transcapsular or vascular invasion.

Symptoms
Patients with thyroid oncocytomas present with a thyroid nodule, usually with normal thyroid function. If the tumor is big or invasive, there may be other symptoms such as difficulty swallowing or talking.

Additional images

See also 
 Kidney
 Renal cell carcinoma
 Hurthle cell

References

External links 

Kidney cancer
Salivary gland neoplasia